Vidocq may refer to:

 Eugène François Vidocq (1775–1857), a 19th century criminal-turned-crime fighter; founder of the French National Police and the first known private detective agency

Films 

 Vidocq (1939 film), a historical crime film
 Vidocq (2001 film), a fantasy murder mystery

Other 

 Vidocq Society, a crime-solving club in Philadelphia, Pennsylvania, US
 A character in the manga series Nobunagun
 Vidocq, a comics series by Hans G. Kresse